Joseph Harrison (born 1957 Richmond, Virginia) is an American poet, and editor.

He grew up in Virginia and Alabama.
He graduated from Yale University with a  Bachelor of Arts degree in 1979, and from Johns Hopkins University with a  Master of Arts degree in 1986. He is Senior American Editor for Waywiser Press. He lives in Baltimore.

Awards
 2005 Academy Award in Literature from the American Academy of Arts and Letters
 2009 Guggenheim Fellow

Works
 Someone Else’s Name Zoo Press, 2003, ; Waywiser Press, 2007 
 Identity Theft, Waywiser Press, 2008, 
 Shakespeare's Horse, Waywiser Press, 2015.

Anthologies
 The Best American Poetry 1998, Editors John Hollander, David Lehman, Charles Scribner's Sons, 1998, 
 "Air Larry", 180 More Extraordinary Poems for Every Day, Editor Billy Collins, Random House, Inc., 2005, 
 Poetry: a pocket anthology, Editor R. S. Gwynn, Longman, 2002,  
 The Swallow Anthology of New American Poets, Editor David Yezzi, Swallow Press, 2009,

References

American male poets
Yale University alumni
1957 births
Johns Hopkins University alumni
Writers from Richmond, Virginia
Living people